Elizabeth Robinson (born 1961) is an American poet.

Elizabeth Robinson may also refer to:
Elizabeth Robinson Montagu (1718–1800), British social reformer, arts patron, literary critic and writer
Elizabeth G. Robinson (1899–1960), Canadian politician, member of the Legislative Assembly of Alberta
Betty Robinson (1911–1999), American runner